Dinas station was built by the Festiniog Railway (FR). It was the first passenger station in Blaenau Ffestiniog, then in Merionethshire, now in Gwynedd, Wales. This station is not to be confused with  some miles distant on the Welsh Highland Railway; nor is it to be confused with the Festiniog and Blaenau Railway's northern terminus in the centre of Blaenau Ffestiniog which was sometimes referred to colloquially as "Dinas".

Context
The evolution of Blaenau's passenger stations was complex, with five different railway companies providing services to the area.

Opening
The station opened on 6 January 1865, carrying passengers to Portmadoc and points between. This was the first steam-hauled passenger service in Britain to use tracks of less than Standard Gauge, with the line carrying a quarter of a million people in its first year of operation. The station's first stationmaster was Mr John Lloyd, the initial service was five trains to and from Portmadoc each day except Sunday.

Location
The station was built among existing slate workings which had been rail-served for some years. The original route to the station and nearby workings was to be buried under slate waste from around 1900, but the railway still needed to access quarries near the former station, so a replacement branch was built from Glan-y-Pwll, allowing the original line to be buried.

The station building was joined to Dinas engine shed which long outlived the station, finally closing in 1900, when it was replaced by a new building at Glan-y-Pwll. The original shed housed the railway's "Top Shunter", a locomotive long given to providing unofficial services to lineside dwellings.

Closure
In 1866 the FR opened Dinas Junction, from which its new "Branch Line" (the original line to Dinas being the "Main Line") ran to the new  station nearer to the centre of the town. Trains from Portmadoc alternated between the two stations, but Duffws was better sited for passenger traffic, so Dinas closed in 1870. Slate traffic to the Dinas station area nevertheless continued well into the 20th Century.

Modern times
The station was eventually covered by slate waste, under which it is now completely buried.

References

Sources

Further reading

External links

Disused railway stations in Gwynedd
Ffestiniog Railway
Railway stations in Great Britain opened in 1865
Railway stations in Great Britain closed in 1870